Anouk is a Dutch female given name and diminutive of Anna.

People
 Anouk, or Anouk Teeuwe, (born 1975), Dutch singer-songwriter
 Anouk Aimée (b. 1932 as Françoise Sorya Dreyfus), pseudonym of a French film actress
 Anouk Hoogendijk (b. 1985), a Dutch footballer
 Anouk Denton (b. 2003), an English footballer
 Anouk Nieuwenweg (born 1996), a Dutch handballer
 Anouk Renière-Lafrenière (b. 1983), a Canadian synchronized swimmer

See also 
 Anuk
 

Dutch feminine given names